La Vuelta is a village in Lloró Municipality, Chocó Department in Colombia.

Climate
La Vuelta has an extremely wet tropical rainforest climate (Af).

References

Populated places in Colombia